The 4th Marine Battalion was a marine battalion of the Republic of Vietnam Marine Corps during the Vietnam War. The battalion was formed in early 1961 and based at Vũng Tàu in Phước Tuy province (now Bà Rịa–Vũng Tàu province). The battalion ceased to exist after the Fall of Saigon on 30 April 1975 and the collapse of the South Vietnamese government.

References
Vietnamese Marine Corps

External links
http://k16vbqgvn.org/tranbinhgia.htm

Military units and formations of South Vietnam